This is a list of electoral results for the electoral district of Nollamara in Western Australian state elections.

Members for Nollamara

Election results

Elections in the 2000s

}

Elections in the 1990s

Elections in the 1980s

References

Western Australian state electoral results by district